Ulsan Beongae Market (lit. Ulsan Lightning Market) is a traditional street market in Nam-gu, Ulsan, South Korea. The market contains more than 150 shops that sell fruit, vegetables, meat, fish, breads, clothing, and Korean traditional medicinal items. The market is also home to many small restaurants and street food stalls.

See also
 List of markets in South Korea
 List of South Korean tourist attractions

References

External links
Official website for Ulsan Beongae Market 

Nam District, Ulsan
Retail markets in Ulsan
Food markets in South Korea